The Syracuse Consolidated Street Railway, chartered on May 22, 1890, in Syracuse, New York. On July 1, 1890, the company leased, in perpetuity, several street railroads in the city including Third Ward Railway, Fourth Ward Railroad, Fifth Ward Railroad, Seventh Ward Railroad, Eleventh Ward Railroad, Genesee and Water Street Railroad, Woodlawn and Butternut Street Railway, Syracuse and Geddes Railway and New Brighton and Onondaga Valley Railroad.

The company filed for bankruptcy in 1893 and merged with the Syracuse Rapid Transit Railway Company in May 1896.

References

Defunct railroads in Syracuse, New York
Defunct New York (state) railroads
Railway companies established in 1890
Railway companies disestablished in 1896
American companies disestablished in 1896
American companies established in 1890